Tiong Hoa Hwee Koan (THHK) was an Indonesian Chinese organization founded on March 17, 1900 in Batavia, Dutch East Indies.

Its founders included former classmates Lie Kim Hok and Phoa Keng Hek Sia, both of whom had been educated at Sierk Coolsma's missionary school in the Dutch East Indies. At first its mission was to renew and spread Confucian ideas and the general level of knowledge among the Chinese-Indonesian population of the Indies.

References

Indonesian people of Chinese descent
1900 establishments in the Dutch East Indies
20th century in Jakarta